Tyresö Fotbollsförening is a Swedish football club in Tyresö, a municipality in Stockholm County. The club was founded in 1971 and is primarily known for its main women's team, which competed in the top-tier league Damallsvenskan in the 2010–2014, 1993–1996 and 1999 seasons, winning the Swedish Championship in 2012. Notable players that have played for the team include the most capped footballer of all time Kristine Lilly, joint FIFA Female Player of the Century Michelle Akers and six time FIFA World Player of the Year Marta.

Tyresö FF are affiliated to the Stockholms Fotbollförbund. In 2011 and 2012, they finished runners-up in the Swedish Cup. In the 2012 season, Tyresö won Damallsvenskan title for the first time. The club reached the 2014 Champions League Final but experienced serious financial problems that year, with the club's parent joint-stock company Tyresö Fotboll AB going bankrupt on 24 June 2014. The team withdrew from the 2014–15 Champions League season, with Linköpings FC taking their spot. During the 2014 season, the team withdrew from Damallsvenskan, meaning they would be relegated to the fourth-tier league Division 2.

In 2017 the team started again in the third tier Division 1. It reached mid table places in the next two seasons.

The club has an associated men's team who play in the lower categories.

History

2000s
In 2005 a young Tyresö team were relegated to Division 3, the regionalised fourth tier of Swedish women's football. That autumn Hans Löfgren joined the club's board as football manager and presided over a swift rise through the divisions. Two successive promotions in 2006 and 2007 were followed by a year of consolidation in 2008; finishing sixth in the Division 1. Promotion back to the Damallsvenskan was secured in 2009. By attracting a network of sponsors Löfgren had funded the increasingly ambitious acquisition of new players every season. By the time the club returned to the top level Damallsvenskan in 2010, Jennifer Egelryd was the only player who remained from the 2005 Third Division team.

After two fourth-placed finishes in 2010 and 2011, Tyresö won the Damallsvenskan title on the last day of the 2012 season after beating rivals LdB FC Malmö 1–0. In doing so they qualified for the UEFA Women's Champions League for the first time. Löfgren had withdrawn from day-to-day involvement with the club in late 2011, after his conviction for buying sex. In Sweden it is illegal to buy sex, but not to sell it.

Insolvency (2014)
The club faced serious financial problems in 2014, yet achieved sporting success. The team reached the Final of the 2013–14 UEFA Women's Champions League.

In March 2014 reports emerged that Tyresö Fotboll AB, the female club's parent joint-stock company, was in arrears with its tax payments and on the verge of bankruptcy. Club chairman Hans Lindberg blamed loss of sponsorship and the cost of building a new stand at Tyresövallen stadium for the shortfall. The club asked the local authority for a one-off grant of SEK 2.7 million in order to continue trading, but the request was unanimously rejected. Instead, a debt restructuring plan was drawn up, which included an aid project designed in cooperation with an unnamed African state.

Later in March 2014, the district court in Nacka ruled that Tyresö Fotboll AB could continue with their restructuring plan. The Swedish Tax Agency had intended to block the plans and force the club out of business, but changed their minds after receiving more detailed information about repayments. As the Government of Sweden guarantees the wages of citizens whose employers go bankrupt, up to SEK 176,000, the players' salaries were paid. But the club remained in a form of administration, so prize money from the UEFA Women's Champions League would go to the Government and Tax Agency first, as the highest priority creditors. This also meant that large contractual bonuses promised to the players would not be paid.

It became clear that Tyresö's large and expensively assembled squad would break up. The club announced in April 2014 that leading players Marta, Caroline Seger and Verónica Boquete were all leaving the club when their contracts expired in June 2014. This was in addition to the three American players who had already committed to return to the National Women's Soccer League (NWSL) when Tyresö's UEFA Women's Champions League campaign ended. In late April Birmingham City Ladies manager David Parker described Tyresö FF as female "galácticos" before they beat his team 3–0 in the UEFA Women's Champions League semi-final.

As of early June 2014, Tyresö Fotboll AB had racked up a debt of nearly 10 million SEK. The club filed for continued debt restructuring but it was turned down on 10 June 2014. The team withdrew from the 2014–15 Champions League season, with the 2013 Damallsvenskan's third-placed team Linköpings FC taking their spot. Having played eight matches in the 2014 Damallsvenskan, the team withdrew from the league on 5 June 2014 due to lack of players, meaning they would be relegated to the fourth-tier league Division 2. All their results were nullified and deleted from the table.

On 24 June 2014, Tyresö Fotboll AB went bankrupt and ceased to exist. It's uncertain whether the main women's team will continue play in the 2015 season, although the club has another women's team playing in the third-tier league Division 1 as of the 2014 season.

Season results

Stadium

Tyresö currently play at Tyresövallen, a football stadium located in Tyresö, Sweden. The stadium holds capacity for 2,700 spectators. It features a synthetic pitch that is 105x65 meters, an audio system and game clock.

Broadcasting
Tyresö FF games are broadcast on TV4 Sport in Sweden. Matches are also available live via the TV4 Sport website.

Record in UEFA Women's Champions League
All results (away, home and aggregate) list Tyresö's goal tally first.

a First leg.

Current squad

Former players
For details of current and former players, see :Category:Tyresö FF players.

Honours
UEFA Women's Champions League:
Runner up (1): 2014
 Damallsvenskan:
 Champions (1): 2012
Svenska Cupen:
Runner up (2): 2011, 2012

References

External links
 Tyresö FF – Official website

 
Football clubs in Stockholm
Association football clubs established in 1971
Women's football clubs in Sweden
1971 establishments in Sweden
Damallsvenskan teams